Qualification for the 2007 Little League World Series took place in eight United States regions and eight international regions in July and August 2007.

One change from the 2006 Qualification is the configuration of the Asia-Pacific region.  Japan was detached from the Asia region to form its own region and the remainder of the Asia region was added to the Pacific region to form the new Asia-Pacific region.

United States

Great Lakes

The tournament took place in Indianapolis, Indiana from August 2–11.

Mid-Atlantic

The tournament took place in Bristol, Connecticut from August 3–13.

Midwest

The tournament took place in Indianapolis, Indiana from August 3–11.

Note: The Dakotas are organized into a single Little League district.

New England

The tournament took place in Bristol, Connecticut from August 3–13.

Northwest

The tournament took place in San Bernardino, California from August 4–12.

Southeast

The tournament took place in St. Petersburg, Florida from August 4–9.

Southwest

The tournament took place in Waco, Texas from August 4–10.

West

The tournament took place in San Bernardino, California from August 3–11.

International

Asia-Pacific

The tournament took place in Hong Kong from July 8–14.

Canada

The tournament took place in Regina, Saskatchewan from August 4–11.

Caribbean

The tournament took place in Yabucoa, Puerto Rico from July 21–28.

Europe, Middle East and Africa

The tournament took place in Kutno, Poland from August 1–8.

Japan

The first two rounds of the tournament were held on July 7, and the remaining two rounds were played on July 21. All games were played in Tokyo.

Latin America

The tournament took place Panama City, Panama on July 8–14.

Mexico

The tournament took place in Mexico City from July 13–22.

Phase 1

Phase 2

Phase 3

Transatlantic

The tournament took place in Kutno, Poland from July 23–29.

External links
 

2007 Little League World Series